2022–23 Calcutta Women's Football League is the 27th season of the Calcutta Women's Football League, also known as the Kanyashree Cup.

The season consists of 32 teams participating in the league, with the teams in the group stage divided into four groups consisting of eight teams each. The top two teams from each group qualify for the knockout stage. Each team consists of a maximum of four outstation players and every team has two under-17 players. IFA has also appointed an "Integrity Officer" in each team for the sake of women footballers. On 28 January 2023, East Bengal defeated Sreebhumi 1–0 in the final to lift the Kanyashree Cup title and qualified for the Indian Women's League.

Teams

Venues
 Rabindra Sarobar Stadium
 East Bengal Ground
 Naihati Stadium
 Amal Dutta Stadium (Dumdum Surer Math)
 Mohammedan Sporting Ground
 Rishi Aurobindo Maidan, Konnagar
 Bidhannagar Sports Complex
 SAI Ground, Salt Lake
 Mohun Bagan Ground
 Netaji Sports Complex, Kamalgazi
 Barrackpore Stadium
 Dr Ambedkar Ground, Gayeshpur
 Kishore Bharati Krirangan

Group stage

Group A

Matches

Group B

Matches

Group C

Matches

Group D

Matches

Knockout stage

Qualified teams
The top two placed teams from each of the four groups qualified for the knockout stage.

Bracket

Quarter-finals

Matches

Semi-finals

Matches

Final

Summary
The 2022–23 Kanyashree Cup final was held at the Kishore Bharati Krirangan on 28 January 2023 between Sreebhumi and East Bengal. East Bengal reached their fourth final, having won the tournament once previously back in 2001, and been runners-up twice in 2002 and 2020. They had defeated Mohammedan Sporting 3–0 in the semi-final. Whereas, Sreebhumi reached their second final, being runners-up in 2019. They had defeated W.B. Police Club 1–0 in the semi-final. The match kicked off with East Bengal leading the proceedings from the beginning and dominating possession but could not break the deadlock. The solitary goal game in the eighty-eighth minute of the match when a long throw-in from Anita Oraon was partially cleared which fell onto the feet of Kabita Saren, who put in a cross and was met by Sulanjana Raul with a header that found the back of the net at the far post. East Bengal managed to hold onto the lead for the remainder of the game and was crowned as the 2022–23 Kanyashree Cup winners, lifting their second title after 2001.

Match

Season awards
The following awards were announced at the end of the season:

 Emerging Player of the Tournament: Sulanjana Raul (East Bengal)
 Highest Goalscorer: Sujata Mahata (New Alipore Suruchi Sangha) – 23 goals in 7 matches
 Best Goalkeeper: Gurubari Mandi (Sreebhumi)

References 

2022–23 in Indian football leagues
2022–23 domestic women's association football leagues